The NH Gran Hotel Provincial is a five star establishment in Mar del Plata, Argentina.

Overview
The hotel is one of a pair of twin buildings designed by architect Alejandro Bustillo. Inspired by seafront Hotel du Palais in Biarritz, France, the hotel and neighboring Casino Central remain architectural landmarks of the city of Mar del Plata as well as of Argentina. Surrounded by an esplanade built by the provincial government in 1938 with the future hotel in mind and facing Bristol Beach, the lobby featured murals painted by César Bustillo (the architect's son) and its decoration was planned by famed French designer Jean-Michel Frank (who was in Argentina at work on the Llao Llao Hotel) together with Casa Comte.

Completed in 1948, the 500-room establishment was inaugurated on February 18, 1950, and was long the largest in Argentina. The neighboring Casino Central, opened in 1939, was the largest in the world by floor space until the 1990 opening of Trump Taj Mahal Casino Resort, in Atlantic City.

The operation of the publicly owned hotel was privatized under licence to the local Empresa Hotelera Americana in the early 1990s, though ongoing losses led to the agreement's rescission at the end of 1998; unable to finance its operation, the province kept the hotel shuttered from that date.

The province obtained an investment bid from the Madrid-based NH Hotels Group for the Gran Provincial's reopening, in April 2008. Following refurbishment works directed by local architect Alejandro Novakovsky and totalling nearly US$30 million, the hotel was re-inaugurated on February 8, 2009. Its  of floor space includes 469 rooms and 12 suites, as well as a convention center.

The hotel has hosted numerous Mar del Plata Film Festivals, as well as the 2010 Ibero-American Summit. Its more notable international guests have included actors Gina Lollobrigida and Paul Newman, as well as U.S. Presidents Franklin Roosevelt and Dwight Eisenhower.

Now the hotel is often offered as a place for taking different events. For example, here will held the Congress of plastic surgery in November 2021.

References

External links
NH Gran Hotel Provincial 

Hotels in Argentina
Tourist attractions in Mar del Plata
Hotel buildings completed in 1948
Buildings and structures in Mar del Plata
Hotels established in 1950